Shepherd M. Barrett (born c. December 6, 1889) was an American African American artist from Huntingdon Valley, Pennsylvania. Over the course of a more than fifty year artistic career he created in excess of 225 sculptures. His medium of choice was carved wood, more particularly peach stone carvings. These sculptures were created using a variety of instruments such as knives, picks and needle sized manually operated drills and with such practiced skill that a work might be created in as little as two hours. Despite their diminutive size, his works were detailed, such as monkeys with facial expressions, fingers and toes.

In addition to his work as a peach stone carver, for which he was featured in the May 1962 edition of Ebony Magazine, Barrett also was a more general artist, and was a player of the violin, cello and viola. His hobbies included being a magician and ventriloquist. He worked as a fireman in Bryn Athyn, Pennsylvania from approximately 1953 to 1962. He died in Montgomery County, Pennsylvania in 1967.

Sources
“Peach Stone Carver”, Ebony Magazine, May 1962

External links
Speaking of People, Ebony Magazine, May 1962, Vol. 17 Issue 7, p. 6

Folk artists
Sculptors from Pennsylvania
1880s births
1967 deaths